Abun may refer to:
 Abuna, a honorific title in the Ethiopian church
 Abun district, in West Papua, Indonesia
 Abun people, a Papuan ethnic group
 Abun language, a Papuan language
 Abun, India, a village in Panki block in Jharkhand, India
 ABUN, an Australian television station call sign